Nakaozawa-zeki is an earthfill dam located in Chiba Prefecture in Japan. The dam is used for irrigation. The catchment area of the dam is 0.9 km2. The dam impounds about 3  ha of land when full and can store 137 thousand cubic meters of water. The construction of the dam was started on 1934 and completed in 1938.

References

Dams in Chiba Prefecture
1938 establishments in Japan